"Morirò da re" is a song by Italian group Måneskin. It was released on 23 March 2018 by Sony Music as the lead single from their debut album Il ballo della vita.

Description
Appearing as the final track of the album, the song represents the first unpublished publication of the group to feature Italian language and was composed during the days off from the first tour held following their success at "X Factor Italy". Regarding the meaning of the text, the Måneskin themselves explained that it concerns redemption:

Music video
The music video for "Morirò da re", directed by Antonio Usbergo and Niccolò Celaia, premiered on 26 March 2018 via Måneskin's YouTube channel.

Charts

Certifications

References

2018 songs
2018 singles
Italian-language songs
Måneskin songs
Sony Music singles
Songs written by Damiano David
Songs written by Victoria De Angelis